Tattwa Prakash Satapathy, better known by his stage name Papu Pom Pom, is an Indian film, television, Music Director, standup comedian and an Odisha Legislative Assembly candidate. Satapathy has acted in over 50 Odia movies. He was the main lead in the well-known Odia television comedy serial 'Excuse Me: Jaha Kahibi Sata Kahibi , Faltu Katha, Eita Bayata. He acted more than 500 characters in Television.

Early life 

His father is a high school headteacher and performing artist.

Satapathy has pursued a Bachelor of Science in Chemistry from Udala College, MSCB University. During those days he won the position of dramatic secretary in his college.

Politics 
Satapathy joined politics and got a ticket from Biju Janata Dal for Champua Odisha Vidhan Sabha constituency for the assembly election 2014, beaten by the Former Congress Senior Leader and current independent M.L.A. candidate Mr. Sanatan Mahakud. then he left politics.

Production House 
He has owned his own production house for Youtube as Papu Pom Pom Creations and recently he has acted in a special dance item number "Station Bazaar Jhiati..", which is superhit in youtube.

In 2018, Papu Pom Pom announced his new film titled Chirkut. This film is being made under the banner of Akshay Kumar Parija production. The movie has featured several new faces as well as experienced actors. Chirkut stars Arojeet, Ananya, Krupasindhu, Samskriti, Deepak Tripathy, Harita, Siddarth, Aravind Jena, Sonu and Ayushi. This time, Papu will not be featured as the comedian, but as a talented  director cum music director. In an announcement ceremony along with producer Akshay Kumar Parija, all the cast and crew of the film were present in a city hotel. Papu remained out of sight in media for over a year due to illness.

Filmography 
Following is the filmography of Papu Pom Pom.

References

External links 
 

Living people
21st-century Indian male actors
Biju Janata Dal politicians
Indian male comedians
Male actors in Odia cinema
Maharaja Sriram Chandra Bhanja Deo University alumni
Place of birth missing (living people)
Year of birth missing (living people)